Pieter Coolman (born 24 April 1989) is a Belgian volleyball player, a member of the Belgium men's national volleyball team and club Knack Randstad Roeselare, a gold medalist of the 2013 European League.

His younger sister Nina Coolman, who is also a volleyball player, is a member of [VC Oudegem].

Sporting achievements

Clubs 
Belgian Cup:
  2013, 2016, 2017, 2018
Belgium Championship:
  2013, 2014, 2015, 2016, 2017
  2018
Belgian SuperCup:
  2013, 2014

National Team 
European League:
  2013

References

External links
FIVB profile
FIVB profile
KnackVolley profile
Volleyball-Movies profile

1989 births
Living people
Sportspeople from Bruges
Belgian men's volleyball players
21st-century Belgian people